Sakharov (feminine: Sakharova) is a Russian surname, derived from the word "сахар" (sugar). Other spellings of the surname are Saharov / Saharova, Sakharoff , Saharoff.

The surname may refer to:

Saharov
 Aleksander Saharov (born 1982), Estonian professional footballer

Sakharof
 Berry Sakharof (born 1957), Israeli rock guitarist, songwriter and singer

Sakharoff
 Alexander Sakharoff (1886–1963), Russian dancer, teacher, and choreographer

Sakharov
 Alik Sakharov (born 1959), American television director.
 Andrei Sakharov (1921–1989), Russian physicist and anti-Soviet dissident
 Andrey Nikolayevich Sakharov (1930–2019), Russian historian
 Anton Sakharov (born 1982), Russian footballer
 Gleb Sakharov (born 1988), Uzbek–French tennis player
 Nikita Sakharov (1915–1945), Soviet Evenk writer
 Sophrony (Sakharov) (1896–1993), Christian monk, mystic and teacher
 Vladimir Sakharov (born 1948), former Soviet footballer
 Vladimir Viktorovich Sakharov (1853–1920), general of the Russian Imperial Army
 Vladimir Vladimirovich Sakharov (1902–1969), Soviet geneticist
 Yuri Sakharov (1922–1981), Ukrainian chess master

Sakharova
 Julia Sakharova, Russian violinist

Other
 1979 Sakharov, a main-belt asteroid named for Andrei Sakharov
 Sakharov (film), a 1984 TV film starring Jason Robards as Andrei Sakharov

See also
 Sakharov Prize
 Zakharov (Russian: Захаров)

Russian-language surnames